ClearSkies™ is the fourteenth studio album by American electronic musician Vektroid (under her alias PrismCorp Virtual Enterprises), released on April 20, 2013 by PrismCorp and Beer on the Rug. The album was released simultaneously with her previous PrismCorp album Home™.

Track listing

Digital release

Cassette release

Side A

Side B

ClearSkies: Complete Edition

References

External links
Internet Archive

2013 albums
Vektroid albums
Vaporwave albums